Skencil, formerly called Sketch, is a free software vector graphics editor, released under the GNU Lesser General Public License. Its first public version, Sketch 0.5.0, was released on October 31, 1998.

As claimed on its website, "Skencil is implemented almost completely in Python, a very high-level, object oriented, interpreted language, with the rest written in C for speed."

Version 0.6.17 of Skencil was released in 2005, and a preview 1.0 alpha was released in 2010 by sK1 project team. It has versions compatible with Linux on the i386, DEC Alpha, m68k, PowerPC and SPARC architectures, with FreeBSD, with Solaris, with IRIX64 6.4, and with AIX.

Future plans had included porting the user interface from Tk to GTK+, a multiple document interface, and multi-font, fully integrated multiline text. Since 2010 the project development is frozen. 

sK1 project written in wxWidgets became Skencil successor, improved by color management (including CMYK colorspace support), tabbed multiple document interface, Pango based text engine, Cairo based renderer and importers for CorelDRAW (CDR, CMX, CCX) and many other graphics file formats.

See also

 List of vector graphics editors
 Comparison of vector graphics editors

References

External links
 

Free graphics software
Free vector graphics editors
Free software programmed in C
Free software programmed in Python
Vector graphics editors for Linux
Graphics software that uses GTK